Benjamin B. Lee, popularly known as Ben Lee,  served from 1998 as managing director of the City & County of Honolulu under Mayor of Honolulu Jeremy Harris.  During leaves of absence by Mayor Harris, Lee had assumed the role of acting mayor of Honolulu several times during his tenure.  In 2002, he was prepared to become mayor of Honolulu pending Mayor Harris' resignation to run for Governor of Hawai'i.  Mayor Harris abruptly dropped out of the race and Lee continued on as managing director.

External links
 May 21, 2004, "City Managing Director Receives Distinguished Service Award"

Place of birth missing (living people)
Year of birth missing (living people)
County officials in Hawaii
Living people